Bilibig Dian Mahrus (born 27 March 1986) is an Indonesian footballer who plays as a defender for Perseru Serui in the Indonesia Super League and now in the Indonesia Soccer Championship.

References

External links 

Player profil at goal.com
Bilibig Dian Mahrus at ligaindonesia.co.id

Living people
1986 births
Indonesian footballers
Liga 1 (Indonesia) players
Perseru Serui players
Badak Lampung F.C. players
Association football defenders